Howard Austen (born Howard Auster; January 28, 1929 – September 22, 2003) was the longtime companion of American writer Gore Vidal.  They were together for 53 years, until Austen's death.

Early life and career
Austen was born into a working-class Jewish family and grew up in The Bronx, New York. Reportedly, Austen wanted to have a career as a singer. In 1950, when Vidal met Austen, Austen had just graduated and was struggling to find work writing advertising copy. At Vidal's suggestion, he changed his surname from "Auster" to "Austen" "after advertising firms refused to hire him because he was Jewish". Immediately after he changed his name, he was hired at Doyle, Dane & Bernbach, which was considered a very good house and is known as DDB today. Austen would go on to become a stage manager for Broadway shows in the 1950s and 1960s. He also worked in film, assisting with the casting of the classic 1962 film To Kill a Mockingbird.

Personal life
Austen was described as red-haired and freckle-faced and was 21, having just graduated from New York University, when he met Vidal at New York's Everard Baths on Labor Day, 1950. Vidal has been reported as describing their relationship as "two men who decided to spend their lives together". Austen managed the couple's complicated financial affairs, travel arrangements and housing needs, both at their home in Hollywood and in their La Rondinaia villa in Ravello, Italy on the Amalfi coast. In September 2003, Austen died from a brain tumor at the age of 74 in Los Angeles, California. In February 2005, Austen was re-buried at Rock Creek Cemetery, in Washington, D.C., in a joint grave meant for Vidal and Austen.

External links

References

American advertising people
American theatre people
American casting directors
Stage managers
1929 births
2003 deaths
American LGBT businesspeople
LGBT Jews
20th-century American Jews
Businesspeople from Los Angeles
Businesspeople from New York City
LGBT people from California
LGBT people from New York (state)
New York University alumni
People from the Bronx
People from Hollywood, Los Angeles
People from Ravello
Deaths from brain cancer in the United States
Burials at Rock Creek Cemetery
20th-century American businesspeople
Gore Vidal
21st-century American Jews